Kalab-e Sufian-e Sofla (also Romanized as Kalāb-e Şūfīān-e Soflá; also known as Kalāb-e Soflá, Kalāb-e Şūfīān, and Kalāb Sūfīān) is a village in Khatunabad Rural District, in the Central District of Jiroft County, Kerman Province, Iran. At the 2006 census, its population was 1,053, in 220 families.

References 

Populated places in Jiroft County